Fraser Anderson (born 20 April 1984) is a former professional rugby footballer who played rugby union for the Kobelco Steelers.  Anderson previously played rugby league in the National Rugby League for Brisbane and Cronulla-Sutherland.

Background
Anderson was born in Auckland, New Zealand. Anderson is of Tongan descent. He is the brother of Louis Anderson and Vinnie Anderson.

Early years
Fraser Anderson attended The Church College of New Zealand. Anderson is a member of the Church of Jesus Christ of Latter-day Saints and served for two years as a missionary in Olongapo in the Philippines.

Rugby league career
Anderson made his first grade rugby league debut for the Brisbane Broncos in round 14, 2006 against South Sydney Rabbitohs at Telstra Stadium. Anderson then became a regular in the Cronulla-Sutherland Sharks line up during the 2007 and 2008 seasons, playing either in the centres or the second row.  Anderson's final game in the NRL was the 2008 preliminary final match against Melbourne which Cronulla lost 28–0 at the Sydney Football Stadium.

Representative career
Anderson was named in both the Tonga training squad and the New Zealand training squad for the 2008 World Cup. He did not make the New Zealand side, but was selected to play for Tonga in the World Cup.

Rugby union career
On 24 February 2009 it was announced that Anderson had been granted an immediate release from his Sharks contract to take up a two-year contract with Top League Japanese rugby union club, Kobelco Steelers, worth A$400,000 per year.

References

1984 births
Living people
Brisbane Broncos players
Cronulla-Sutherland Sharks players
East Coast Bays Barracudas players
Expatriate rugby union players in Japan
Kobelco Kobe Steelers players
Mormon missionaries in the Philippines
New Zealand expatriate rugby union players
New Zealand expatriate sportspeople in Japan
New Zealand expatriate sportspeople in the Philippines
New Zealand Latter Day Saints
New Zealand Māori rugby league players
New Zealand sportspeople of Tongan descent
New Zealand rugby league players
New Zealand rugby union players
People educated at the Church College of New Zealand
Rugby league centres
Rugby league locks
Rugby league players from Auckland
Rugby league second-rows
Rugby league wingers
Rugby union players from Auckland
Rugby union wings
Tonga international rugby union players